Powell Street is a street in San Francisco, California that connects from Market Street through Union Square, North Beach, Nob Hill, Russian Hill and ends at Fisherman's Wharf.

The intersection of Powell Street with Market Street is the starting point of the Powell-Hyde Street terminal line of the San Francisco Cable Car, which ends on Hyde Street at the Aquatic Park Historic District.

The street was named for Dr. William J. Powell, surgeon of the U.S. sloop of war Warren, which was active during the conquest of California.

Notes

External links
 

Chinatown, San Francisco
Nob Hill, San Francisco
North Beach, San Francisco
Shopping districts and streets in the United States
Streets in San Francisco